Līčupe(former Braki) is a village in the Ogre Municipality in the Vidzeme region of Latvia. The village is known for its production of Latvian apple cider.

Towns and villages in Latvia
Ogre Municipality
Vidzeme